Lucky Shiner is the debut studio album by English electronic music producer Gold Panda. It was released on 7 September 2010 through Ghostly International in the United States, while Notown Records released it on 12 October 2010 in the United Kingdom.

Production
Gold Panda recorded Lucky Shiner in two weeks over Christmas at his aunt and uncle's house in the Essex countryside. The album is named after his grandmother.

Critical reception

At Metacritic, which assigns a weighted average score out of 100 to reviews from mainstream critics, Lucky Shiner received an average score of 80 based on 22 reviews, indicating "generally favorable reviews".

It received an honorable mention at Pitchforks "Albums of the Year 2010" list. MusicOMH named it the 50th best album of 2010. Stereogum named it the 39th best album of 2010.

Track listing

Charts

References

External links
 

2010 debut albums
Ghostly International albums
Gold Panda albums